Milak (also Romanized as Mīlak) is a village in Hayat Davud Rural District, in the Central District of Ganaveh County, Bushehr Province, Iran. At the 2006 census, its population was 33, in 5 families.

References 

Populated places in Ganaveh County